Mirage is the fourth studio album by the Arizona alternative rock band Meat Puppets.

The album was reissued in 1999 by Rykodisc with five additional bonus tracks, including early demos of "The Mighty Zero," "I Am a Machine" and "Liquified" as well as a cover of the Elvis Presley song "Rubberneckin'" and the previously unreleased "Grand Intro." As an added bonus, this album includes an "Enhanced CD" partition for play on home computers. Mirage offers the promotional video for "Get On Down."
Drummer Derrick Bostrom has referred to the album as their "psychedelic epic".

Music 
Chuck Eddy called the music of Mirage "a sideways brand of cactus-country rock", similar to the Meat Puppets' two preceding albums. "Liquified" has been described as "metal-ish" and compared to the band's early work, whereas "Confusion Fog" invited comparisons to the album Meat Puppets II.

Reception 
Chuck Eddy wrote in a June 1987 edition of SPIN Magazine that Mirage was "catchier and more intricate" than Meat Puppets II and Up on the Sun.

Track listing
All songs written by Curt Kirkwood, unless otherwise noted.

Original album

 "Mirage" – 3:40
 "Quit It" – 2:36
 "Confusion Fog" – 3:49
 "The Wind and the Rain" – 2:57
 "The Mighty Zero" (Curt Kirkwood, Cris Kirkwood) – 3:18
 "Get on Down" – 2:55
 "Leaves" – 2:38
 "I Am a Machine" – 4:21
 "Beauty" – 3:02
 "A Hundred Miles" – 3:34
 "Love Our Children Forever" – 3:56
 "Liquified" – 3:11

CD reissue bonus tracks

 "The Mighty Zero" (Demo Version) (Curt Kirkwood, Cris Kirkwood) - 3:40
 "I Am a Machine" (Demo Version) - 4:05
 "Liquified" (Demo Version) - 3:39
 "Rubberneckin’" (Dory Jones, Bunny Warren) - 2:46
 "Grand Intro" - 2:03

Personnel
Meat Puppets
Curt Kirkwood - guitar, vocals, artwork, sleeve drawings
Cris Kirkwood - bass, vocals
Derrick Bostrom - drums, cover artwork

References

Meat Puppets albums
1987 albums
SST Records albums